Legion of the Doomed may refer to:

another nickname of The Writing 69th, a group of journalists who flew on World War II bombing missions
Legion of the Doomed (film), a 1958 adventure film

See also
Legion of Doom (disambiguation)